WerkGang is a Thai record label and a subsidiary of GMM Grammy that produces music on various music genres such as pop and rock.  Its current managing director is Kritsana Warin.

Roster

Current acts 
 MR.Lazy
 
 SPF
 
 
 SALEE
 CHASE
 BEAT BOYZ
 D DAY
 FULL
 MINOR THIRD
 COOKIE CUTTER

References

External links 

GMM Grammy
Thai record labels